El Cancionero: Mas y Mas is a four-CD box set by the American rock band Los Lobos, released in 2000. It contains album tracks, live recordings, rarities, and alternate versions, as well as tracks from solo and side projects, soundtracks, and tribute albums. Of the eighty-six tracks on the box set, eleven are previously unissued.

"El Cancionero" translates as "songbook" or "the person who interprets songs," according to guitarist/drummer Louie Pérez. The set was the subject of an essay by author Nick Hornby in his collection Songbook.

Reception

Writing for AllMusic,  Stephen Thomas Erlewine called it "the definitive portrait of Los Lobos". He wrote, "As the set winds from the authentic Mexican folk music of 1977 through the gutsy roots rock of 1987 and the dreamy soundscapes of 1992 to the daring music of the mid-'90s and then the consolidation of their strengths on 1999's This Time, it's hard not to be astonished not just by the band's range, but the fact that they do it all really well."

The Guardian described the box set as "a comprehensive history of the band" with "dodgy patches among the triumphs". The eighty-six tracks are, according to The Guardian, "so varied it seems remarkable that they should be recorded by the same musicians."

Track listing

Note
 Tracks 8 and 9 recorded live January 14, 1984 at La Casa de la Raza, Santa Barbara, California.

Notes
 Track 5 recorded live December 11, 1987 at the Hollywood Palladium, Hollywood, California.
 Track 20 recorded live October 18, 1987 in Burbank, California.

Notes
 Track 12 recorded live January 9, 1993 at the Moritz von Bomhard Theatre/Kentucky Center for the Performing Arts, Louisville, Kentucky.
 Track 20 recorded live May 16, 1996 at the Wells Fargo Theater/Autry Museum of the American West, Los Angeles, California.

Note
 Track 21 recorded live August 2, 1997 at Molson Park, Barrie, Ontario, Canada.

Personnel 
Credits adapted from the album's liner notes.

Los Lobos
 David Hidalgo – vocals, electric and acoustic guitars, accordion, violin, banjo, 6-string bass, piano, drums, percussion
 Cesar Rosas – vocals, electric and acoustic guitars, mandolin
 Louie Pérez – drums, percussion, guitar, fraustophone, vocals, lead vocals on "Alone in a Crowd"
 Conrad Lozano – electric and acoustic basses, fretless bass, guitarrón, vocals, lead vocals on "Guantanamera"
 Steve Berlin – saxophones, flute, harmonica, melodica, keyboards, percussion

Additional musicians
 Charlie Tovar – congas, percussion (Disc one: 1, 2)
 T-Bone Burnett – acoustic guitar, organ (Disc one: 10-16), vocals (Disc one: 19-25)
 Alex Acuña – percussion (Disc one: 10-16, 19-25 / Disc two: 6, 12, 19 / Disc three: 1-7 / Disc four: 17), hand drums (Disc two: 11), shekere (Disc two: 14), drums (Disc four: 17) 
 Ry Cooder – accordion, bajo sexto (Disc one: 17)
 Jim Dickinson – piano (Disc one: 17)
 Jorge Calderon – bass (Disc one: 17)
 Jim Keltner – drums (Disc one: 17 / Disc two: 16, 17), percussion (Disc one: 17 / Disc two: 17)
 Mitchell Froom – keyboards (Disc one: 19-25 / Disc three: 1-7, 13, 14 / Disc four: 15, 17-20), harmonium (Disc two: 12)
 Mickey Curry – drums (Disc one: 19-25 / Disc two: 1)
 Anton Fier – drums (Disc one: 19-25)
 Ron Tutt – drums (Disc one: 19-25)
 John Hiatt – vocals (Disc one: 19 / Disc two: 14)
 Danny Timms – organ, Wurlitzer (Disc two: 14), piano (Disc two: 16)
 Jerry Marrota – drums (Disc two: 11, 14 / Disc 4: 15), percussion (Disc four: 15)
 Levon Helm – vocals (Disc two: 13)
 Victor Bisetti – percussion (Disc two: 18 / Disc three: 1-10, 15-17, 19, 20 / Disc four: 1-8, 17-21), drums (Disc three: 8-12, 15, 17-20 / Disc four: 7, 12-14)
 Fermin Herrera – Veracruz harp (Disc three: 6)
 Pete Thomas – drums (Disc three: 1-7 / Disc four: 1-5, 18, 19)
 La Chilapeña Brass Band – horns (Disc three: 9)
 Tchad Blake – bass, guitar (Disc three: 13, 14 / Disc four: 15)
 Robert Rodriguez – guitar (Disc three: 19)
 Yuka Honda – keyboards, sampling (Disc four: 1-5)
 Efrain Toro – percussion (Disc four: 1-5)
 Money Mark – keyboards (Disc four: 6)
 Paul Burlison – guitar (Disc four: 7)
 Jim Weider – guitar (Disc four: 7)
 Joe Ely – guitar, vocals (Disc four: 9, 10)
 Rick Trevino – guitar (Disc four: 9, 10), vocals (Disc four: 9-11)
 Freddy Fender – acoustic bass, vocals (Disc four: 9, 10)
 Ruben Ramos – vocals (Disc four: 9-11)
 Joel Guzman – piano, organ, accordion, percussion, vocals (Disc four: 9, 10)
 Max Baca – bajo sexto, bass, drums, vocals (Disc four: 9, 10)
 Sarah Fox – backing vocals (Disc four: 9)
 Will-Dog – bass (Disc four: 11)
 Alberto Salas – piano, percussion (Disc four: 11)
 Cougar Estrada – drums, percussion (Disc four: 11)
 Raul Malo – vocals (Disc four: 11)
 Eddie Baytos – organ (Disc four: 12, 13)
 Flaco Jiménez – accordion, vocals (Disc four: 14)
 Wendy Melvoin – vocals (Disc four: 15)
 Lisa Coleman – vocals (Disc four: 15)
 Mike Halby – vocals, instruments (Disc four: 16)
 Aaron Ballesteros – drums (Disc four: 20)
 Sheryl Crow – vocals (Disc four: 21)

Technical
 Luis R. Torres – producer (Disc one: 1, 2)
 Los Lobos – producer (Disc one: 1, 2, 18-25 / Disc two: 7-11, 13-19 / Disc three: 1-11, 16-19 / Disc four: 1-6, 8, 17-20)
 Steve Berlin – producer (Disc one: 3-7, 10-16 / Disc two: 2-4 / Disc four: 9-11), mixing (Disc three: 18, 19)
 T-Bone Burnett – producer (Disc one: 4-7, 10-16, 19-25)
 Larry Hirsch – producer (Disc two: 9-11, 13-17), engineer (Disc one: 15, 18-25 / Disc two: 6-11, 13-17), mixing (Disc one: 15, 18 / Disc two: 9-17) 
 Ry Cooder – producer (Disc one: 17)
 Mitchell Froom – producer (Disc two: 1, 12 / Disc three: 1-7 / Disc four: 1-5, 17-20)
 Hal Willner – producer (Disc two: 6)
 Tchad Blake – producer (Disc four: 1-5, 17-20), engineer (Disc two: 12 / Disc three: 1-7 / Disc four: 1-5, 17-20), mixing (Disc three: 1-7, 11, 17 / Disc four: 18-20)
 Latin Playboys – producer, engineer, mixing (Disc three: 13, 14 / Disc four: 15)
 John Chelew – producer (Disc three: 15)
 Leib Ostrow – producer (Disc three: 16)
 Eugene Rodriguez – producer (Disc three: 16)
 Cesar Rosas – producer (Disc four: 12-14, 21), engineer (Disc three: 16, 18, 19 / Disc four: 12-14), mixing (Disc three: 16 / Disc four: 8, 17, 21)
Mario Caldato Jr. – producer, engineer, mixing (Disc four: 6)
 Jim Weider – producer (Disc four: 7)
 David Hidalgo – producer (Disc four: 16)
 David Sandoval – associate producer (Disc one: 1, 2)
 Joe Schiff – associate producer, engineer, mixing (Disc three: 15), assistant engineer (Disc two: 9-11, 13-17)
 David Hirshland – associate producer (Disc three: 15)
 Patrick Flynn – engineer (Disc one: 1, 2)
 Mark Fleisher – engineer, mixing (Disc one: 1, 2)
 George Johnsen – engineer (Disc one: 3)
 Mark Linett – engineer (Disc one: 4-14, 16), mixing (Disc one: 4-7), remixing engineer (Disc one: 21)
 Mark Ettel – engineer, mixing (Disc one: 17)
 Stephen Shelton – engineer (Disc two: 6), assistant engineer (Disc one: 19-25)
 Bob Schaper – engineer (Disc two: 1-4 / Disc four: 6), mixing (Disc two: 19 / Disc three: 18)
 Keith Keller – engineer (Disc two: 5)
 Scott Woodman – engineer (Disc two: 7, 8)
 Stacy Baird – engineer (Disc two: 9-11, 13-17)
 Clark German – engineer (Disc two: 9-11, 13-17)
 Dusty Wakeman – engineer (Disc two: 18)
 Peter Doell – engineer (Disc two: 18)
 Paul duGré – engineer (Disc two: 19 / Disc 3: 8, 9), mixing (Disc three: 8, 9)
 John Paterno – engineer (Disc four: 1-5, 7, 8, 17-20), assistant engineer (Disc three: 1-7, 13, 14 / Disc four: 15), mixing (Disc four: 8, 12-14)
 Bill Jackson – engineer (Disc three: 10, 17, 19), mixing (Disc three: 19)
 David Wells – engineer (Disc three: 11, 16)
 Warren Dennis – engineer, mixing (Disc three: 16)
 Dave McNair – engineer (Disc four: 9-11), mixing (Disc four: 9, 10)
 Husky Hoskulds – engineer (Disc four: 17-20), assistant engineer (Disc four: 15)
 Mike Monroe – engineer (Disc four: 16)
 Louis Stetzel – engineer (Disc four: 21)
 Charles Paakkari – assistant engineer (Disc one: 10-14, 16)
 Judy Clapp – assistant engineer (Disc one: 17)
 David Glover – assistant engineer (Disc one: 19-25)
 Mike Kloster – assistant engineer (Disc one: 19-25)
 Jimmy Preziosi – assistant engineer (Disc one: 19-25)
 Doug Schwartz – assistant engineer (Disc one: 19-25)
 Tony Chiappa – assistant engineer (Disc one: 17, 19-25)
 Magic Moreno – assistant engineer (Disc one: 19-25)
 Dan Bosworth – assistant engineer (Disc two: 9-11, 13-17 / Disc three: 1-7))
 Eric Rudd – assistant engineer (Disc two: 9-11, 13-17)
 Brian Soucy – assistant engineer (Disc two: 9-11, 13-17), mixing (Disc four: 17)
 Tom Nellen – assistant engineer (Disc two: 9-11, 13-17)
 Neal Avron – assistant engineer (Disc two: 9-11, 13-17)
 Julie Last – assistant engineer (Disc two: 12)
 Wendy Thompson – assistant engineer (Disc two: 19 / Disc three: 8, 9)
 Steve Gamberoni – assistant engineer (Disc four: 9, 10)
 Fred Rennert – assistant engineer (Disc four: 9, 10)
 Robert Breen – assistant engineer (Disc four: 11)
 Howard Willing – assistant engineer (Disc four: 17-20)
 Josh Turner – assistant engineer (Disc four: 17-20)
 Joe Zook – assistant engineer (Disc four: 17-20)
 Joe Ferla – mixing (Disc two: 6)
 Ralph Sall – mixing (Disc two: 18)
 Ray Blair – mixing engineer (Disc two: 18)
 Mike Kloster – mixing assistant (Disc two: 19)
 Michael Prince – mixing (Disc three: 16)
 John Holbrook – mixing (Disc four: 7)
 Paul Rabjohns – digital assembly (Disc three: 19)

Box set
 Gary Stewart – producer
 Tim Bernett – executive producer
 Los Lobos – executive producer 
 Bill Inglot – remastering, sound producer
 Dan Hersch – remastering
 Cesar Rosas – music research
 Jo Motta – project coordinator
Gary Peterson – discographical annotation
 Steve Berlin – discographical annotation
 Vanessa Atkins – editorial supervision
 Sheryl Farber – editorial supervision
 Daniel Goldmark – editorial research
 Louie Pérez – editorial direction, art supervision
 Shawn Amos – A&R editorial coordinator
 Hugh Brown – art direction
 Al Quattrocchi – art direction
 Jeff Smith – art direction
 Tornado Design – design
 James Austin – cover inspiration
 Stan Grant – cover painting

References

Los Lobos albums
2000 compilation albums
Rhino Records compilation albums